Horizon Forbidden West is a 2022 action role-playing game  developed by Guerrilla Games and published by Sony Interactive Entertainment. The sequel to 2017's Horizon Zero Dawn, the game is set in a post-apocalyptic version of the Western United States recovering from the aftermath of an extinction event caused by a rogue robot swarm. The player can explore the open world and complete quests using ranged and melee weapons against hostile machine creatures.

Horizon Forbidden West was released on February 18, 2022, for PlayStation 4 and PlayStation 5. It was praised for its visuals, combat, vocal performances and technical advancements, while the writing and open world design drew mixed responses. An expansion, Burning Shores, will be released on April 19, 2023.

Gameplay
Horizon Forbidden West is an action role-playing game played from a third-person perspective. The player controls Aloy, a hunter in a world populated by dangerous, animalistic machines. In an open world, she explores the mysterious frontier known as the Forbidden West, a post-apocalyptic version of the Western United States, specifically the states of California, Nevada, and Utah. The map is larger than in the previous game. Exploration is improved with new underwater discoveries, and improvements to combat using the Valor Surge system, freeform climbing, and tools such as the Shieldwing, Focus Scanner, Diving Mask, and Pullcaster. The mission structure for quests better supports variety in objectives with compelling reward systems.

Synopsis

Setting
Horizon Forbidden West continues the story of Aloy (Ashly Burch), a young hunter of the Nora tribe and a clone of the Old World scientist Elisabet Sobeck, as she leads a band of companions on a quest to the arcane frontier known as the Forbidden West to find the source of a mysterious plague that kills all it infects. On her journey across these uncharted lands, Aloy encounters new regions ravaged by massive storms and deadly machines, and conflicts with a tribe of nomadic raiders who have tamed the machines as war mounts. She discovers a vast array of environments and ecosystems, including lush valleys, dry deserts, snowy mountains, tropical beaches, ruined cities, and underwater settings.

Plot
In the six months following the defeat of HADES (Anthony Ingruber) in Horizon Zero Dawn, Aloy has been searching fruitlessly for a working backup of GAIA (Lesley Ewen) to restore the planet's rapidly degrading biosphere. Sylens (Lance Reddick), having stolen HADES, contacts Aloy and asks her to continue her search in the Forbidden West region.

Aloy and her friend Varl (John Macmillan) cross into the west to find the ruling Tenakth tribe in the midst of a civil war between Chief Hekarro (Geno Segers) and the rebel leader Regalla (Angela Bassett). Aloy tracks Sylens to a facility where she finds HADES badly damaged, and permanently deletes it. She recovers a GAIA backup without its subsystems, but is interrupted by a group of futuristic humans. The group, consisting of their leader Gerard (Dan Donohue), his lieutenant Tilda (Carrie-Anne Moss), enforcer Erik (Marc Kudisch) and accompanied by a clone of Sobeck named Beta (also voiced by Burch), possess advanced technology that renders them invulnerable. They take a second GAIA backup while Aloy barely escapes.

Zo (Erica Luttrell), a member of the nearby Utaru tribe, guides Aloy to a control center where she rejoins GAIA with her subsystem MINERVA. GAIA locates the other subsystems AETHER, DEMETER, and POSEIDON, and advises Aloy to retrieve them before attempting to capture the more advanced HEPHAESTUS. GAIA reveals the extinction signal that triggered HADES originated from the Sirius system; Aloy suspects that it was sent by the futuristic humans. She later tracks down Beta, who informs Aloy that her group are in fact Far Zenith, colonists who fled Earth during its global extinction, having managed to extend their natural lifespans. After their colony on Sirius collapsed, the Zeniths returned to Earth to use GAIA through Beta's genetic make-up for their own recolonization. They have acquired subsystems ELEUTHIA, ARTEMIS, and APOLLO, but Beta has stolen their GAIA backup.

Aloy recovers AETHER after helping Hekarro advance in the war and retrieves POSEIDON from the ruins of Las Vegas. Journeying to California, she encounters the Quen, a foreign tribe who are attempting to solve ecological crises in their homeland. Aloy helps tribe member Alva (Alison Jaye) with acquiring data, while recovering DEMETER. After obtaining a high level clearance from the tomb of a mutated Ted Faro (Lloyd Owen) in the ruins of San Francisco, Aloy uses GAIA to trap HEPHAESTUS, and is attacked by the Zeniths. Erik kills Varl and recaptures Beta while Gerard steals GAIA, but Tilda double crosses them and helps Aloy escape. Tilda explains that she was romantically involved with Elisabet and regretted leaving her; having been inspired by Aloy, she wishes to stop Far Zenith. She further reveals that Sylens has been supporting the Tenakth rebels to use them against the Zeniths. Aloy refuses to sacrifice the Tenakth and instead defeats Regalla herself after thwarting the latter's final attack on Hekarro.

Aloy and her companions assault Far Zenith's base, while Beta releases HEPHAESTUS into the Zeniths' network and ties down Far Zenith's army. Sylens disables the Zeniths' personal defences, allowing Aloy and Zo to kill Erik, while Tilda kills Gerard. Aloy and Beta learn that the Far Zenith colony was in fact destroyed by Nemesis, a failed mind uploading experiment they created; the Zeniths fled from Nemesis and hoped to steal GAIA to colonize a new planet. Nemesis also sent the extinction signal to Earth, and is en route to destroy the planet. Tilda tries to force Aloy to abandon Earth with her, but Aloy refuses and is forced to kill Tilda. Sylens reveals that HADES told him about Nemesis, and also plans to escape Earth, but has a change of heart and decides to aid Aloy against Nemesis. Aloy's companions disperse to spread the warning of Nemesis, while Aloy and Beta reactivate GAIA.

Development
Guerrilla Games began developing Horizon Forbidden West in 2018, a year after its predecessor Horizon Zero Dawn was released. It was published by Sony Interactive Entertainment for the PlayStation 4 and PlayStation 5. The director is Mathijs de Jonge and the narrative director is Benjamin McCaw. Joris de Man, The Flight (composed of Joe Henson and Alexis Smith), and Niels van de Leest return to compose an original score for the game alongside Oleksa Lozowchuk. Ashly Burch, Lance Reddick, and John Hopkins reprise their roles as Aloy, Sylens, and Erend, respectively. Angela Bassett plays a new character named Regalla, and Carrie-Anne Moss plays Tilda. Using motion capturing, Aloy's motions were acted by Peggy Vrijens.

The PlayStation 5's increased processing power, custom solid-state drive storage, Tempest Engine, and DualSense controller provides the game with advanced haptic feedback, 3D spatial audio, enhanced lighting, special water rendering, improved visual effects, and reduced loading times. This version has an optional "performance mode" at 60 frames per second with a lower base resolution, and an updated version of the Decima engine supporting high dynamic range.

Release
Horizon Forbidden West was announced during Sony's PlayStation 5 reveal event in June 2020 with a planned release in 2021. On May 27, 2021, Guerrilla Games showcased a 14-minute PlayStation 5 gameplay demo for the game in Sony's State of Play presentation. In June 2021, head of PlayStation Studios Hermen Hulst said they were on track for a late 2021 release but development was being partly impacted by the COVID-19 pandemic, as they were having trouble getting access to performance capture and talent. On August 25, 2021, it was announced that its release had been delayed to February 18, 2022. The game had "gone gold" on January 27, 2022, according to Guerrilla Games, meaning that physical copies were ready to be produced, with any further development delivered through online software updates.

The PlayStation 4 version can be freely upgraded to the PlayStation 5 version. The PlayStation 4 version comes on two Blu-ray discs containing 97GB, and the PlayStation 5 version comes on one Ultra HD Blu-ray disc containing 98GB.

A comic book series, set after the events of the first game, was published by Titan Comics on August 5, 2020. On June 3, 2021, Guerilla released an extended play (EP) titled The Isle of Spires composed of four tracks. On February 16, 2022, Argentine singer Nathy Peluso released "Emergencia", an electronic single inspired by the video game. In the music video, Peluso takes on the role of Aloy.

A downloadable expansion titled Horizon Forbidden West: Burning Shores was announced at The Game Awards 2022. In this expansion, Aloy must explore Los Angeles and deal with a "sinister threat". It will be released exclusively for the PS5 on April 19, 2023.

Reception 

Horizon Forbidden West received "generally favorable" reviews according to review aggregator Metacritic. Many critics praised the game's larger setting compared to the first entry. In a review published by Wired, Swapna Krishna praised Horizon Forbidden West as a successful open world game and as a manageable alternative to the less forgiving gameplay of The Witcher 3, while in a review for NPR, Krishna compared the game favorably to the first in the series, writing that it "continues the achievements of its predecessor" while "seeking to improve upon them in every way". Jason Schreier, in a review for Bloomberg, echoed this sentiment, writing "The mantra for Horizon Forbidden Wests development appears to be: make everything bigger, better and more beautiful." Conversely, in a mixed review for The Telegraph, Dan Silver characterized the game's open world and scale as "overwhelming".

Some critics noted technical issues at launch, ranging from minor graphical issues, to crashes and losses of save files.

Sales 
In the UK, Forbidden West was the best digitally selling game during the week of release. At least 49% of all sales in the UK were made digitally. By the end of 2022, 530,454 copies of the game had been sold in the UK. In Germany, over 200,000 copies of the game were sold during its launch month. The PlayStation 4 version of Horizon Forbidden West was the third bestselling retail game during its first week of release in Japan, with 48,476 physical copies being sold. The PlayStation 5 version sold 43,012 physical copies in Japan throughout the same week, making it the fourth bestselling retail game of the week in the country.

Awards 
In July 2022 Forbidden West won the best game award and the best Visual Art award at the 2022 Star Awards. The game was up for 7 nominations at The Game Awards 2022, including Game of the Year, but lost to Elden Ring. It received five nominations at the 19th British Academy Games Awards.

References

External links

 
 
 

2022 video games
Action role-playing video games
Decima (game engine) games
Fiction about immortality
Genocide in fiction
Golden Joystick Award winners
Guerrilla Games games
Horizon Zero Dawn
Open-world video games
PlayStation 4 games
PlayStation 5 games
Post-apocalyptic video games
Science fiction video games
Single-player video games
Sony Interactive Entertainment games
Video game sequels
Video games about robots
Video games adapted into comics
Video games developed in the Netherlands
Video games featuring female protagonists
Video games postponed due to the COVID-19 pandemic
Video games set in California
Video games set in Nevada
Video games set in San Francisco
Video games set in Utah
Video games set in the 31st century
Video games set in the Las Vegas Valley